Aakhri Sajda is a 1977 Bollywood film.

Cast 
Mala Sinha
Murad
Helen
Jagdeep

Music 
"Nighaah-e-shauq Se" – Mohammed Rafi
"Bula Lo Dar Pe Habibe-khuda" – Mohammed Rafi
"Kisi Se Mili Hai Nazar" – Usha Mangeshkar
"Nazar Milao Pata Chale" – Usha Mangeshkar

External links 
 

1977 films
Films scored by Sajjad Hussain
1970s Hindi-language films